The 17th Attack Squadron is a squadron of the United States Air Force.  It is assigned to the 432d Wing, and stationed at Creech Air Force Base in Indian Springs, Nevada. The 17th is equipped with the MQ-9 Reaper.

Overview 
The 17th conducts intelligence, surveillance, and reconnaissance operating the flies MQ-9 Reaper remotely piloted aircraft.

History

World War II
Constituted as 17 Photographic Reconnaissance Squadron on 14 Jul 1942.  Activated on 23 Jul 1942 with Lightning P-38/F-5 reconnaissance aircraft at Colorado Springs AAB, CO.  Redesignated as:  17 Photographic Squadron (Light) on 6 Feb 1943; 17 Photographic Reconnaissance Squadron on 13 Nov 1943.  Deployed to the South Pacific Area, assigned to Thirteenth Air Force.  Flew hazardous unarmed reconnaissance missions over enemy-held territory in Guadalcanal; New Guinea; Northern Solomon Islands; Bismarck Archipelago; Western Pacific; Leyte; Luzon; Southern Philippines; Central Burma and southeast China.  Inactivated in the Philippines, 19 April 1946.

Redesignated as 17 Tactical Reconnaissance Squadron, Photo-Jet on 1 Apr 1951.  Activated on 2 Apr 1951 at Shaw AFB, South Carolina.  Redesignated as 17 Tactical Reconnaissance Squadron on 1 Oct 1966.  Inactivated 1 January 1979.  Redesignated as 17 Reconnaissance Squadron on 4 Mar 2002.  Activated on 8 March 2002 at Indian Springs AFAF (later, Creech AFB), NV. Redesignated as 17 Attack Squadron on 15 May 2016.

Cold War reconnaissance

Reactivated at Shaw Air Force Base, South Carolina in 1951 as a photo-reconnaissance training squadron.   Equipped with several reconnaissance aircraft during the 1950s, deploying to NATO in 1959 with the McDonnell RF-101C Voodoo.  Operated from France until 1966, moving to RAF Upper Heyford, England.  Remained in England until 1970, moved to Zweibrucken AB, West Germany and re-equipped with McDonnell RF-4C Phantom II aircraft.  Remained at Zweibrücken Air Base until 1 January 1979.

Unmanned vehicle operations

The squadron was reactivated at what was then known as Indian Springs Air Force Auxiliary Field (now Creech Air Force Base) on 8 March 2002, flying the MQ-1 Predator. Added the larger and more heavily-armed MQ-9 Reaper in 2006.

According to the 2014 documentary film Drone, since 2002 the squadron had been working for the Central Intelligence Agency as "customer", carrying out armed missions in Pakistan.

Lineage
 Constituted as the 17th Photographic Reconnaissance Squadron on 14 July 1942
 Activated on 23 July 1942
 Redesignated 17th Photographic Squadron (Light) on 6 February 1943
 Redesignated 17th Photographic Reconnaissance Squadron on 13 November 1943
 Inactivated on 19 April 1946
 Redesignated 17th Tactical Reconnaissance Squadron, Photo-Jet on 1 April 1951
 Activated on 2 April 1951
 Redesignated 17th Tactical Reconnaissance Squadron on 1 October 1966
 Inactivated 1 January 1979
 Redesignated 17th Reconnaissance Squadron on 4 March 2002
 Activated on 8 March 2002
 Redesignated 17th Attack Squadron on 15 May 2016

Assignments 
 4th Photographic Group (later 4th Photographic Reconnaissance and Mapping Group, 4th Photographic Group 4th Reconnaissance Group), 23 July 1942
 Thirteenth Air Force, 5 December 1945
 XIII Fighter Command, 10 December 1945
 85th Fighter Wing; 1 February 1946
 Pacific Air Command, U. S. Army, 1–19 April 1946
 363d Tactical Reconnaissance Group, 2 April 1951
 432d Tactical Reconnaissance Wing, 8 February 1958
 66th Tactical Reconnaissance Wing, 10 May 1959
 86th Tactical Fighter Wing, 12 January 1970
 26th Tactical Reconnaissance Wing, 31 January 1973 – 1 January 1979
 57th Operations Group, 8 March 2002 – 1 May 2007
 432d Operations Group, 1 May 2007
 732d Operations Group, 10 September 2012 – present

Stations 
 Colorado Springs Army Air Base, Colorado, 23 July – 24 October 1942
 Camp Deptha, Nouméa, New Caledonia, 2 December 1942
 Henderson Field (Guadalcanal), Guadalcanal, Solomon Islands, 16 January 1943
 Detachment operated from: Munda Airfield, New Georgia, Solomon Islands, c. 13 October 1943 – 31 January 1944, 9 March – 1 April 1944
 Detachment operated from: Buka Airfield, Bougainville, Solomon Islands, c. 11 December 1943 – February 1945
 Detachment operated from: Kornasoren (Yebrurro) Airfield, Noemfoor, Schouten Islands, 8–23 October 1944
 Detachment operated from: Sansapor Airfield, Netherlands East Indies, 13 October – 4 November 1944
 Wama Airfield, Morotai, Netherlands East Indies, 4 November 1944
 Detachment operated from: Dulag Airfield, Leyte, Philippines, 9 February–October 1945
 Puerto Princesa Airfield, Palawan, Philippines, 11 May 1945 – 19 April 1946
 Shaw Air Force Base, South Carolina, 2 April 1951 – 10 May 1959
 Laon-Couvron Air Base, France, 10 May 1959
 RAF Upper Heyford, England, September 1966
 Zweibrücken Air Base, Germany, 12 January 1970 – 1 January 1979
 Indian Springs Air Force Auxiliary Field (later Creech Air Force Base), Nevada, 8 March 2002 – present

Aircraft 

 Lockheed P-38 Lightning, 1942–1946
 North American B-25 Mitchell, 1944–1946
 North American F-6 Mustang, 1946
 Lockheed RF-80 Shooting Star, 1951–1955
 Republic RF-84F Thunderflash, 1954–1958

 McDonnell RF-101C Voodoo, 1957–1969
 McDonnell RF-4C Phantom II, 1969-1978
 MQ-1 Predator, 2002–2018
 MQ-9 Reaper, 2006–present

References

Notes

Bibliography

External links 

1 0017
Indian Springs, Nevada
017